Chen Chin-jang (born 1 February 1935) is a Taiwanese politician. He sat on the National Assembly from 1992 to 2005, and served as Minister of Examination between 1996 and 1999.

Soon after his 1991 election to the National Assembly, Chen was named secretary general of the legislative body. He served in the role until September 1996, when he became minister of examination. Chen retained his seat in the parliament in the 1996 election, and was the body's acting speaker between 1999 and 2000. In this position, he oversaw the vote that transferred many of the Assembly's powers to the Legislative Yuan. When elections for the National Assembly were next held in 2005, all seats were elected via proportional representation, and Chen was ranked first on the Kuomintang party list. Chen was subsequently elected to the fourth presidium of the National Assembly. In June 2000, Chen was elected to the Kuomintang's Central Standing Committee.

Chen supported Lien Chan's presidential campaign in 2000, and backed Ma Ying-jeou in 2012.

References

1935 births
Living people
Kuomintang politicians in Taiwan
Government ministers of Taiwan
21st-century Taiwanese politicians
20th-century Taiwanese politicians